The 2007–08 Mercyhurst Lakers women's ice hockey team represented Mercyhurst College in the 2007–08 NCAA Division I women's ice hockey season. The Lakers were coached by Michael Sisti and had a 9-2-1 conference record. Assisting Sisti was Paul Colontino and Louis Goulet. Mike Folga was the Head Equipment Manager. Mercyhurst featured eight newcomers in 2007-2008 as the Lakers lost 10 players from the 2006–2007, 32-win team. Seven of those players were lost to graduation.

Exhibition

Recruiting
December 21, 2007: Forwards Bailey Bram, Kelley Steadman, and Jessica Jones have committed next season to play for the Lakers. In addition, defender Pam Zgoda and goaltender Hillary Pattenden have also committed to the program. Forward Lauren Ragen, a transfer from Brown University, will be eligible to play next season.

Regular season
 October 12: Valerie Chouinard registered a hat trick against Boston University
 October 27: Stephanie Jones had a 4-assist game vs. the Colgate Raiders women's ice hockey program
 January 26: Valerie Chouinard had 4 assists Quinnipiac
 During the 2007–08 season, Meghan Agosta tied Krissy Wendell’s record for most shorthanded goals in one season with 7.

Players
Senior Danielle Ayearst was an assistant captain. Her Mercyhurst career included 146 games played (8 goals and 41 assists).
Offensively, Valerie Chouinard was second on the team in goals (16) and points (50), while ranking first in assists (34). Chouinard tied for first in power play goals with 10. She tied for second on the club with 3 game-winning goals. Chouinard would end the season
ended 3rd year with team as all-time leader in points (155, since broken) and power play goals (34).

Laura Hosier had 21 wins, compared to seven losses and three ties. She finished her Mercyhurst career as the program's all-time leader in games played (105), wins (74), and saves (1925), while finishing second in career shutouts with 24. Nationally, Hosier ranked seventh in winning percentage (.726), while placing 13th in goals-against average (2.17).
Stephanie Jones was the team captain in her senior year. She finished her career with 54 goals and 75 assists in 138 games played. In addition, she ranked 5th in career points, tied for 5th in goals, 4th in assists and tied for 4th in game-winning goals. In addition, to playing for Mercyhurst, she played for Team Canada at European Air Canada Cup in January. Offensively, she accumulated 15 goals and 23 assists. Her 15 goals were third on the Lakers, and her 38 points were fourth. In the CHA, her 15 conference points tied for 7th overall. Jones finished her Mercyhurst playing career with 54 goals and 75 assists in 138 games played.
Meghan Agosta had five-point games against Quinnipiac and Colgate and four-goal games against Brown and Colgate. In addition, she had a dozen multiple-goal games and 18 multiple-point games. At the conclusion of her second season at Mercyhurst, Agosta ranked first all-time in goals (78), shorthanded goals (13), and game-winning goals (20). She would end her sophomore second in points (139) and power play goals (26).

Standings

Roster

Schedule

Player stats

Skaters

Goaltenders

Postseason

CHA Tournament
After tying with Wayne State for the regular season title, the Lakers won their 6th straight College Hockey America Playoff with a 2–1 overtime win over Wayne State on March 8 at Niagara University. Stephanie Jones would score the game-winning goal.

NCAA Hockey tournament
On Saturday, March 15, the Lakers season ended with a 5–4 loss at Minnesota Duluth in the NCAA Quarterfinals.

Awards and honors
Meghan Agosta, RBK Hockey/AHCA First Team All-American
Meghan Agosta, Patty Kazmaier Memorial Award Top Three Finalist
Meghan Agosta, CHA Player of the Year
Meghan Agosta, All-CHA First Team
Meghan Agosta, 2008 CHA All-Tournament Team
Meghan Agosta, 2008 CHA Tournament MVP
Meghan Agosta was a member of Team Canada at 2008 European Air Canada Cup where she made All-Tournament Team. In addition, she was chosen to play for Team Canada at Women's World Championship In China in April 2008.
Meghan Agosta set a Mercyhurst record with a 20-game scoring streak. She set a one-game record with 17 shots on goal against Brown. In addition, she had a single-season record in shorthanded goals with seven.
Danielle Ayearst, CHA Defensive Player of the Week, (Week of November 26)
Danielle Ayearst CHA All-Academic Team 
Vicki Bendus, 2008 CHA Rookie of the Year
Vicki Bendus, 2008 CHA All-Rookie Team 
Valerie Chouinard, Patty Kazmaier Award nominee
Valerie Chouinard, CHA Offensive POTW October 15
Valerie Chouinard, CHA All-Academic Team
Valerie Chouinard, Second Team All-Conference
Laura Hosier, first in CHA in goals-against-average (1.88)
Laura Hosier, CHA All-Tournament Team
Laura Hosier,  CHA All-Academic Team
Laura Hosier,  Frozen Four Skills Challenge participant
Stephanie Jones, CHA All-Tournament Team
Stephanie Jones, CHA Student Athlete of the Year
Stephanie Jones, Bill Smith Award (an in-house honor for meritorious service on-and-off-the ice) 
Johanna Malmstrom, CHA All-Academic Team 
Jesse Scanzano, 2008 CHA All-Rookie Team

International
Valerie Chouinard played for Team Canada at European Air Canada Cup in January 2008 and was selected as an alternate for Team Canada at the 2008 Women's World Ice Hockey Championships in China in April.

 Meghan Agosta, Laura Hosier, and Stephanie Jones, were all members of Canada's Under-22 Team at the 2008 European Air Canada Cup.

References

External links
Official Site

Mercyhurst Lakers women's ice hockey seasons
Mercyhurst
Mercy
Mercy